Remillard or Rémillard is a Canadian surname that may refer to the following notable people:

 Remillard Brothers, owners of brick manufacturing plants in California, U.S., from the 1860s to the mid-1900s
Remillard, a protagonist family in the Galactic Milieu Series
Bruno N Rémillard (born 1961), Canadian mathematical statistician
Édouard Rémillard (1830–1909), Canadian lawyer and political figure 
Gil Rémillard (born 1944), Canadian university professor and politician
Marc Rémillard, French-Canadian electronic music artist and producer
Matt Remillard (born 1986), American boxer
Maxime Rémillard, Canadian businessman
Nicholas Rémillard (born 1976), Canadian scholar

French-language surnames